Lerner Newspapers was a chain of weekly newspapers. Founded by Leo Lerner, the chain was a force in community journalism in Chicago from 1926 to 2005, and called itself "the world's largest newspaper group".

In its heyday, Lerner published 54 weekly and semi-weekly editions on the North and Northwest sides of Chicago and in suburban Cook, Lake and DuPage counties, with a circulation of some 300,000. Editions included the Booster, Citizen, Life, News, News-Star, Skyline, Star, Times and Voice.

Overview 
The Lerner papers focused on community news and local issues, including a widely read police blotter, but also featured localized sections devoted to arts and entertainment, food, lifestyles and high-school and neighborhood sports, like "hyper-local" versions of daily newspapers.

At one time, the chain had its own printing plant at its headquarters in the Rogers Park, Chicago, neighborhood and a network of satellite offices across the city and its suburbs.

Journalists who got their start at Lerner include the late Mike Royko, the Crain's Chicago Business columnist Greg Hinz, the Chicago Sun-Times columnists Bill Zwecker and Robert Feder, the sportscaster Bruce Wolf, the novelist William Brashler, the syndicated columnist Robert C. Koehler and Ted Allen, host of Food Network's Chopped and All-Star Academy, and former cast member of the Bravo hit Queer Eye.

History

Beginnings
Leo Lerner (1907–1965) founded his namesake chain in 1926 with the Lincoln-Belmont Booster, turning it from a shopper to a real newspaper.  

From 1924-28, Lerner worked in editorial positions on the Morton Grove News, the North Side Sunday Citizen and the Lincoln Belmont Booster. He then became a partner of A. O. Caplan in the management of the 16 Myers Newspapers, with a combined circulation of 219,000. 

During World War II, Lerner inspired his staff to concentrate on local news with such statements as, "A fistfight on Clark Street is more important to our readers than a war in Europe."

By 1958, Lerner was president of a growing group of newspapers, including the Myers Publishing Co., the Lincoln Belmont Publishing Co., the Times Home Newspapers (J. L. Johnson Publishing Co.) and the Neighbor Press of Chicago. 

Lerner's son Louis A. Lerner served as assistant to the publisher of Lerner Home Newspapers and an account executive for Times Home Newspapers from 1959 to 1962. He became executive vice president of Lerner Home Newspapers in 1962 and publisher in 1969.

Decline and fall

The 49-year-old Louis Lerner died of cancer in 1984. The following year, the Lerner family sold the chain to Pulitzer Publishing, publishers of the St. Louis Post-Dispatch. When it bought the chain of 52 weeklies for $9.1 million, Pulitzer hoped to win readers and advertising dollars from the Chicago Tribune and Chicago Sun-Times in the same way that the Suburban Journal weeklies were weakening the Post-Dispatch. Pulitzer planned to increase Lerner's combined circulation of about 300,000 to compete in the Chicago newspaper market, but the recession of the early 1990s eroded the chain's advertising base, over half of which was help-wanted classified ads, and the chain was unsuccessful in winning automotive and real estate ads away from the dailies.

The sole weekly group in Pulitzer's stable, Lerner was left to founder. Pulitzer closed and merged many of its editions, until only 15 were left. Circulation had plummeted from 300,000 in 1985 to 100,000 by 1992. In 1992, Pulitzer was on the brink of shutting down the Lerner papers but, at the last minute, with final editions set in type, sold the chain's assets to Sunstates Corp. for a reported $4 million. 

Sunstates, an investment firm led by Clyde Engle, was in the business of buying moribund companies for tricky financial operations. Under Sunstates, which owned a mixed bag of companies such as an insurance firm, a chocolate factory, a furniture factory and an apple orchard, but had never before run newspapers, the Lerner chain continued to erode while Sunstates managers constrained journalists to keep 9-to-5 hours.

In 2000, in a surreptitious arrangement that came to be known as the "Lerner Exchange," Sunstates sold the chain to a company fronted by Canadian press baron Conrad Black, who resold it to Hollinger International. This and other illegal maneuvers by Black and sidekick David Radler, Sun-Times publisher, ultimately led to their conviction on fraud charges when they were found to have looted millions from the company. 

Amid Hollinger reorganization (ultimately to the Sun-Times Media Group) in the wake of the scandal, the company merged Lerner Newspapers into its longtime suburban rival, Pioneer Press, in 2005. Pioneer management quickly dropped the now-embarrassing Lerner name and killed all Lerner's suburban editions. Pioneer continued to print a handful of city of Chicago newspapers with the old nameplates — the Booster, News-Star, Skyline and Times — converting them from broadsheet to tabloid, until January 2008, when the company announced it was pulling out of urban publishing entirely. At the last moment, the Booster, News-Star and Skyline titles were sold to the Wednesday Journal, another Chicago-area weekly group.

In March 2009, the Wednesday Journal announced that it was dropping the News-Star and the Booster, along with the Bucktown/Wicker Park edition of the Chicago Journal (into which a Booster edition had been merged). Although reduced to operating from his home, Ron Roenigk, the publisher of Inside Publications, said he would be buying the two former Lerner nameplates, largely to get their legal advertising.

The Skyline, Inside Booster and News Star are still published weekly on Chicago's North Side by Inside Publications.

Editions

Booster

Leo Lerner launched his empire with the 1926 purchase of the Lincoln-Belmont Booster. In 2005, Pioneer Press sold The Booster to the Wednesday Journal, which resold it in 2008 to Inside Publications. Inside Publications merged the Booster with its primary publication (Inside). The new publication retained the Booster's numbering and some of its syndicated columns while incorporating some of Inside's traditional features. 

The Booster covered various North Side neighborhoods, including Avondale, Irving Park, Lake View, Lincoln-Belmont, Lincoln Park, Logan-Armitage, North Center, Roscoe Village and Sheridan Center. The Wednesday Journal-published editions covered Lake View, North Center and Roscoe Village.

Longtime Chicago columnist (Chicago Daily News, Chicago Sun-Times, Chicago Tribune) Mike Royko had his start at the Lincoln-Belmont Booster.

Citizen 
Founded as the Ravenswood Citizen, and dating back until at least 1905, the Citizen was acquired by Lerner in the late 1920s and folded into other editions in 1930.

Life
The Life newspapers ran from the 1920s through 2005, beginning with a Rogers Park edition, and later expanding into covering Chicago's northern suburbs, including, at various times, Buffalo Grove, Deerfield, Des Plaines, Evanston, Ft. Sheridan, Glenview, Highland Park, Highwood, Lake County, Lake Forest, Lincolnwood, Morton Grove, Niles, Niles Township, Northbrook, Skokie and Wheeling. 

Pulitzer shut down most of the Life editions in the 1980s. When Pioneer Press folded the papers in 2005, editions covered Lincolnwood, Morton Grove, Niles and Skokie.

News-Star
Beginning as separate News and Star editions, later combined, the News-Star (also called the News and Star Budget) covered the Far North Side. In 2005, Pioneer Press sold the nameplate to the Wednesday Journal, which resold it in 2008 to Inside Publications.

Communities covered by the various versions included Albany Park, Edgewater, Lake View, Lincoln Square, North Park, North Town, Ravenswood, Rogers Park, Sauganash and Uptown.  The Wednesday Journal-published editions covered Edgewater, Ravenswood, Rogers Park and Uptown.

Lesley Sussman, now an author and journalist in New York City, was for many years editor of the Uptown and Edgewater News.

Skyline

Launched by Lerner in the 1960s, the Skyline covered the Gold Coast, Lincoln Park, the Loop and the Near North Side, with an emphasis on society gossip. The Skyline   was the only Lerner paper not to cover school sports. In 2005, Pioneer Press sold the nameplate to the Wednesday Journal, which continues to publish it, covering the Gold Coast, Lincoln Park, Old Town and River North.

Queer Eye's Allen was a Skyline reporter.
Wednesday's Journal sold the Skyline to Inside Publications in 2013 where it is still being published weekly.

Times
Acquired in the 1950s, and also called the New Times and the Times Home Newspapers, the Times editions covered the Northwest Side and near-west suburbs, including the city neighborhoods Albany Park, Belmont-Cragin, Dunning, Edison Park, Edgebrook, Harlem-Foster, Harlem-Irving, Higgins-Oriole, Jefferson Park, Logan Square, Mayfair, Montrose, O'Hare, Norwood Park and Portage Park and suburban areas including Elmwood Park, Franklin Park, Harwood Heights, Norridge, Northlake, River Grove, Schiller Park and Leyden and Proviso townships. 

At the time Pioneer Press took over and folded the papers in 2005, the Times covered Edison Park, Jefferson Park, Norwood Park and Portage Park in the city and the suburban communities of Elmwood Park, Harwood Heights, Norridge and River Grove.

Voice

Sometimes called the Voice and Advisor Register, the original Voice editions covered Chicago's northwest suburbs, including Addison, Bartlett, Bensenville, Bloomingdale, DuPage County, Elk Grove Village, Glendale Heights, Hanover Park, Hoffman Estates, Itasca, Medinah, Roselle, Rosemont, Schaumburg, Streamwood and Wood Dale.

Pulitzer shut the original Voice down in 1990. 

In the mid-1990s, Sunstates reused the Voice name for a small, short-lived group of north suburban tabloids, launched as shoppers, and then expanded into regular editions covering community news and features, with longtime Chicago journalist Leah A. Zeldes as managing editor. The tabloids covered Glenview, Northbrook and Park Ridge.

Journalists
Prominent journalists who worked for Lerner Newspapers include:

Ted Allen
David Anderson
Ann Barzel
Richard Battin
Al Bernstein
Lawrence Bommer
Jack Bess
Larry Blasko, later a reporter and executive with the Associated Press
Bill Brashler
Jim Braun
Patrick Butler
Angela Caputo
George Castle
Corey Schiff
Dan Cotter
Steve Dale
 Felicia Dechter
Diana Diamond
Leonard Dubkin
Ava Ehrlich
Robert Feder
Ruth Duskin Feldman
Roger Flaherty, later a rewriteman, reporter and assistant metro editor at Chicago Sun-Times
Ann Gerber
Michael C. Glab
 Terry Gorman
Richard Greb
Leigh Hanlon
Greg Hinz
Sheldon Hoffenberg
Audrey Howard
James Clifford Hughes
 Les Jacobson
William Hugh Jones
Robert C. Koehler
Leo Lerner
Louis A. Lerner
Richard C. Lindberg
Cynthia Linton
Valerie Anne Long
Sheila Malkind
 Richard Jules Margolis
Sue Markgraf
Matt McGuire
Dan Mitchell
Kim Okabe
Mary Beth Rose
Matt Rosenberg
Morris Rotman
Art Rotstein, later an Associated Press reporter based in Arizona
Mike Royko
Rosemary Sazanoff
Brenda Schory
"Chicago Ed" Schwartz
Emily Soloff
Will Sullivan
Lesley Sussman
Lorraine Swanson
Lily Venson
Carolyn Walkup
Bruce Wolf
Leah A. Zeldes
Bill Zwecker

See also
Illinois Newspaper Project
Newspapers of the Chicago metropolitan area

References 

Newspaper companies in Chicago
Corporate scandals
Publishing companies established in 1926
Publishing companies disestablished in 2005